"Hay Amores" is a song recorded by Colombian singer-songwriter Shakira for the extended play (EP) and soundtrack Love in the Time of Cholera (2008). The song was written by her for the Mike Newell -directed 2007 movie adaptation of Colombian writer Gabriel García Márquez's 1985 novel Love in the Time of Cholera. Brazilian film score composer Antonio Pinto produced the song and composed it with Shakira. Shakira was initially offered a role by the producers of the movie to take part as the main protagonist. However, she refused the offer and accepted to collaborate with the musical team due to her friendship with García Márquez. "Hay Amores" is a romantic and elegiac bolero song, a music genre born in the late 1800s. Lyrically, the song inscribes the kind of love that only grows fonder as time passes by. The song has won a Premios Nuestra Tierra award in the Best Movie Soundtrack category.

Background and release 

In 1999, Colombian writer Gabriel García Márquez met Shakira. He conducted an interview with her for Colombian magazine Cambio. At the time of the publication of the article, García Márquez expressed Shakira's originality in the music scene. Following this, both of them established friendly relations with one another. During late 2006, the filming of the 2007 movie adaptation of García Márquez's novel Love in the Time of Cholera (1985) started. The story revolves around the character of Florentino Ariza and "his unconditional love for the beautiful Fermina Daza and the sentimental triangle that develops with the regional doctor".

Initially, the producers of the movie offered Shakira a role in it, which would mark her cinematic debut. However, she turned down the offer, claiming that she was not comfortable with the nude scenes that were featured in the movie. Nevertheless, Shakira offered to compose the score of the movie due to her friendship with García Márquez and his influence on her. She started working for the material of the movie with Argentine composer Pedro Aznar in London, England during the second half of 2007. Shakira spontaneously came up with the melody of "Hay Amores'" chorus after seeing an early cut of the film, humming it to the film's director Mike Newell. Later during the recording sessions, Shakira recorded "Despedida" and "Hay Amores", the latter being the movie's theme song. Shakira commented on the song's genre that bolero is "the pinnacle of romantic music" and that it is "in her blood". During the release of the movie in November 2007, Shakira elaborated in an interview: "Being part of the movie was a personal motivation because it is an extraordinary novel of one of the most extraordinary writers in history and a personal friend [...] [while composing the songs I wanted] to present my country's beauty and the works of García Márquez". Shakira has stated in an interview in 2019 that "Hay Amores" and "Despedida" are her "two best songs to date". In October 2007, "Hay Amores" was released to radio in Colombia.

The music video for "Hay Amores" was filmed in Cartagena. It was directed by Vincent Passeri and has a sensual and melancholic ambiance. The video features Shakira performing the track wearing a red dress, as well as some scenes from the film. The video was released in January 2008. Shakira has performed the song live twice, at the premiere of the film, and at Rock In Rio Madrid 2008, where she dedicated it to Íngrid Betancourt. In 2012, Shakira recorded and released a new version of the song on SoundCloud with her father William Mebarak to celebrate his birthday. A video of the two recording the song was uploaded to YouTube and Facebook.

Reception and accolades 
In a soundtrack review, Thom Jurek from AllMusic commented that the three songs by Shakira, "Hay Amores", "Despedida" and "Pienso En Ti", make the soundtrack "worth paying your hard-earned money for". John Li from Moviexclusive highlighted the tenderness of the soundtrack, while describing "Hay Amores" as "seductively beautiful" and noting that all three of Shakira's songs are "accompanied by [her] signature vocals".

The song was awarded at Premios Nuestra Tierra for Best Movie Soundtrack and was nominated for Premios Oye! award in the category of best theme for a soap opera, film or television series.

Charts

Weekly charts

References

External links
Shakira, William Mebarak - Hay Amores on SoundCloud

2007 songs
2007 singles
Shakira songs
Songs written by Shakira
Spanish-language songs